Christos Chrysofakis (born 18 January 1990) is a Greek professional footballer who plays as a midfielder for Super League 2 club Ierapetra.

Club career
Chrysofakis started his career at his local club AS Ierapetra before joining Ergotelis' youth team. He signed his first professional contract with the club on July 22, 2008. He spent the next seven years with Ergotelis, appearing in a total of 33 matches and scoring 2 goals. On January 2, 2014, he was loaned out to Football League side Panegialios until the end of the season. On January 28, 2015, he returned to his home town Ierapetra, signing with local club OF Ierapetra,. In the summer of 2017, he moved to fellow local club AS Ierapetra. After spending another season at fellow Lasithi FCA A Division contenders Agios Nikolaos, Chrysofakis returned to OF Ierapetra, playing in the Football League.

International career
Chrysofakis is a former U19 and U21 international with Greece, having made his debut in a UEFA Under-19 Championship qualifier against Bosnia and Herzegovina.

References

External links
Ergotelis squad at uefa.com

Onsports.gr profile 

1990 births
Living people
Greek footballers
Ergotelis F.C. players
Panegialios F.C. players
Agios Nikolaos F.C. players
O.F. Ierapetra F.C. players
Super League Greece players
Association football midfielders
People from Ierapetra
Footballers from Crete